Benjamin Franklin Lindheimer (October 1, 1889 – June 5, 1960) was an American businessman who owned Chicago's Washington Park Race Track from 1935 to his death in 1960 and was the majority shareholder and Managing Director of Arlington Park Race Track. As well, he was the owner of the Los Angeles Dons of the All-America Football Conference.

Widely respected Hall of Fame trainer Jimmy Jones of Calumet Farm was quoted by Sports Illustrated as saying that Lindheimer "was the savior of Chicago racing" and that "Arlington Park became the finest track in the world—certainly the finest I've ever been on." Lindheimer is well remembered as the person who promoted the 1955 match race broadcast by CBS Television in which Preakness and Belmont Stakes winner Nashua  defeated Kentucky Derby winner, Swaps.

In 1932, Lindheimer managed the successful election campaign for Henry Horner, who was elected Democratic Governor of Illinois.

Benjamin Lindheimer died in 1960 at his vacation home in Beverly Hills, California. His remains were returned to Chicago for burial in Rosehill Cemetery.
 Following its creation, Benjamin Lindheimer was inducted in the Chicagoland Sports Hall of Fame.  Long involved with the business, adopted daughter Marjorie Lindheimer Everett took over management of the racetracks. Funds from his estate were used by his widow to create the Lindheimer Astrophysical Research Center at Northwestern University.

References

1889 births
1960 deaths
Businesspeople from Chicago
All-America Football Conference
Arlington Park
Washington Park Race Track
Burials at Rosehill Cemetery
20th-century American businesspeople